Harry Parker may refer to:

Harry Parker (baseball) (1947–2012), pitcher in Major League Baseball
Harry Parker (footballer), English footballer
Harry Parker (rower) (1935–2013), rowing coach
Harry Parker (swimmer) (1849–1932), English swimmer
Harry Parker (tennis) (1873–1961), New Zealand tennis player
Harry Parker (wrestler), British Olympic wrestler
Harry Parker, 6th Baronet (1735–1812), secretary of the Board of Longitude

See also
Henry Parker (disambiguation)
Harold Parker (disambiguation)